Doust is an English-language surname. Notable people with the surname include:

 Kate Doust (born 1962), Australian politician
 Jon Doust, Australian comedian, writer, novelist and professional speaker from Western Australia
 Matt Doust (1984–2013), American-born Australian hyper-realistic artist
 Dudley Doust (1930–2008), American sportswriter
 Stanley Doust (1879–1961), Australian tennis player
 Martyn Doust (born 1974), English Prop Master and Art Director for TV and Film.

See also 
 Sentenac-d'Oust, commune in the Ariège department in south-western France
 Heber Doust Curtis (1872–1942), American astronomer